Estefania Balda Álvarez (born 25 June 1987) is an Ecuadorian former professional tennis player.

Balda Álvarez has career-high WTA rankings of 519 in singles, achieved on 12 September 2005, and 459 in doubles, set on 12 September 2005. She has won one singles title and three doubles titles on the ITF Women's Circuit.

Playing for Ecuador Fed Cup team, Balda Álvarez has a win–loss record of 9–4.

ITF finals

Singles (1 titles, 1 runner–ups)

Doubles (3 titles)

ITF Junior Circuit

Singles (1–1)

Doubles (1–3)

References

External links
 
 

1987 births
Living people
Ecuadorian female tennis players
Sportspeople from Guayaquil
21st-century Ecuadorian women